Tilman Spengler (born 1947) is a German sinologist, writer, and journalist. The author of more than a dozen books, including Lenin's Brain (1993), he has received several literary prizes throughout his career, including:

 1999 Mainzer Stadtschreiber
 2003 Ernst-Hoferichter-Preis
 2008 Literaturpreis der Stadt München

He is the second husband of actress Daphne Wagner, great-granddaughter of German composer Richard Wagner.

References

External links 
 
 Tilman Spengler in: NRW Literatur im Netz 

1947 births
Living people
German male writers